Triplemanía is the biggest annual professional wrestling event promoted by the Lucha Libre AAA Worldwide (AAA) promotion and is traditionally held in August each year. A majority of the shows have been presented as pay-per-view events, with some being shown as television specials on the Televisa channel or as streaming events on Twitch. The Triplemanía show features culminations of AAA's long building storylines. During the early years of Triplemanía, the event was not a presented as a single show, but a series of shows - either two or three per year. The show has been promoted for 30 years, with 39 shows in total promoted under the Triplemanía banner. The name is a combination of how "AAA" is pronounced in Spanish, "Triple A",  and WrestleMania, WWE's biggest annual show. The latest event, Triplemanía XXX: Mexico City, took place on October 15, 2022 at Arena Ciudad de México in Mexico City, Mexico.

Event history
The first Triplemanía event was held on April 30, 1993 at Plaza de Toros in Mexico City, Mexico. The event drew 48,000 spectators, the largest number for any Triplemanía, indeed the largest number of spectators for any wrestling event in Mexico ever. In 1994, 1995, and 1996 AAA held three Triplemanía events and in 1997 they held two, in subsequent years only one event has been held. Triplemanía has twice been held outside of Mexico, Triplemanía IV-A was held in Chicago, Illinois and Triplemanía VIII was held in Tokyo, Japan. As is tradition with major AAA shows, the wrestlers compete inside a hexagonal wrestling ring and not the usual four-sided ring the promotion uses for regular television events and house shows.

Dates, venues, and main events

See also 

 All Out - All Elite Wrestling (AEW)
 Bound for Glory - Impact Wrestling
 CMLL Anniversary Show - Consejo Mundial de Lucha Libre (CMLL)
 Final Battle - Ring of Honor (ROH)
 The Crash Anniversary Show - The Crash Lucha Libre
 Wrestle Kingdom - New Japan Pro-Wrestling (NJPW)
 WrestleMania - WWE
 WWC Aniversario - World Wrestling Council (WWC)
 November to Remember - Extreme Championship Wrestling (ECW)
 Starrcade - World Championship Wrestling (WCW)
 Ultima Lucha - Lucha Underground

References